Richard Claes Erik Ulfsäter (born 1 September 1975) is a Swedish actor perhaps mostly known for his role as "Steffen" in the SVT comedy series Playa del Sol.

The Author Agneta Ulfsäter-Troell is his aunt. And his father is a cousin of Björn Ulvaeus. In 2009, Swedish magazine Dorian named Ulfsäter as Sweden's sexiest man. In an interview with the magazine, Ulfsäter confirmed that he had been arrested for possessing a small quantity of cocaine in his home. In May 2009, he was sentenced to probation after confessing to the prosecutor in charge of the case. He then voluntarily entered into treatment for addiction. Discussing his recovery in his interview with Dorian, he stated, "Today I stick with wine."

Ulfsäter appeared in all 12 episodes of Camilla Läckberg's Fjällbackamorden as the policeman Patrik. He also appeared in the 2016 French-Swedish series Midnattssol (English title: "Midnight Sun") as helicopter pilot Thor.

Filmography
2000 – Vita lögner
2002 – Spung
2007 – Playa del Sol
2007 – Darling
2008 – Vi hade i alla fall tur med vädret – igen
2008 – Patrik 1,5
2010 – Puss
2010 – Fyra år till
2012 – En fiende att dö för
2012 - Nobel's Last Will
2013 – Inkognito
2013 – Fjällbackamorden
2016 – Midnattssol

References

1975 births
Swedish male actors
Living people
People from Helsingborg